The most frequently presented Miss America awards are for preliminary talent and swimsuit. The talent award was introduced in 1936, and the swimsuit award in 1940. In the 2000s, preliminary awards for evening gown and interview were briefly introduced but were discontinued after two years as it was felt that they made the semi-finalists too predictable.

Other awards include Miss Congeniality, given out in the early years of the pageant and re-introduced at Miss America 2006, and the Quality of Life Award for a contestant's platform, first awarded in 1989.

Preliminary awards

Preliminary on stage interview/Social Impact Pitch award

Preliminary talent award

Preliminary swimsuit award
There have multiple instances of ties for this preliminary award. This occurred at Miss America pageants in 1943, 1946, 1947, 1949, 1953, 1972, 1979, 1987, and 1993.

This award was discontinued since the Miss America 2019 competition and was replaced with state titleholders participating in a live interactive session with the judges, "to highlight her achievements and goals in life and how she will use her talents, passion, and ambition to perform the job of Miss America."

Jean Bartel Quality of Life / Social Impact Initiative Scholarship award
The Quality of Life Award was initially sponsored by Fruit of the Loom.  From its inception in 1989 until 2002, the winner received a $10,000 scholarship.  For Miss America 2003, the value of the award was reduced to $6,000 for the winner, and the amount was reduced again to $3,000 from Miss America 2006.  In 2008, the scholarship returned to $6,000. In 2020, award named was changed to the "Jean Bartel Social Impact Initiative Scholarship Award."

Miss Congeniality

America's Choice
In 2008, the Miss America Organization introduced this award in which viewers could cast votes online for a specific state titleholder a month before the final night of pageant. The state titleholder with the most votes is then given an automatic spot in the semi-finals, regardless of her performance in the preliminary competition. In 2022, the state titleholder with the most votes won an extra $5,000 scholarship.

STEM scholarship award
At the Miss America 2014 pageant, the Miss America Organization introduced this $5,000 scholarship to be given to state titleholders with strong science, technology, engineering, and mathematics (STEM) backgrounds with the goal of highlighting the vital and active roles women have in these fields.

Women in Business Scholarship award

Equity and Justice Scholarship award 
In September 2019, the Miss America Organization announced that a new scholarship, the Equity and Justice Scholarship, will be awarded at the 2020 competition to the candidate, "who best exemplifies inclusion and acceptance of these principles in her social impact initiative." The winner receives a $3,000 scholarship.

References

External links
Miss America official website